Ella Molnár (14 March 1906 – 9 December 1990) was a Hungarian swimmer. She competed in the women's 200 metre breaststroke event at the 1924 Summer Olympics.

References

External links
 

1906 births
1990 deaths
Hungarian female swimmers
Olympic swimmers of Hungary
Swimmers at the 1924 Summer Olympics
Place of birth missing
Hungarian female breaststroke swimmers
20th-century Hungarian women